For show-casing new technology, Solar Power International is a solar power conference created in 2004, when the Solar Electric Power Association (SEPA) and the Solar Energy Industries Association (SEIA) merged to organize an annual event bringing together companies and professionals from the solar industry. In 2008 it was touted as the largest solar power conference in North America. Previously called Solar Power Conference and Expo, it consists of two main elements: an exhibition hall where companies have booths to promote their products and services; and conference sessions where panels of solar industry experts share ideas and success stories.
The 2018 event included hydrogen and fuel cell technologies. The 2019 conference was held in Salt Lake City, Utah on September 23–26.

Attendees
Solar Power International is attended by professionals in the solar industry who are builders, project developers, installers, distributors, engineering firms, investors and financiers, service providers, law firms, equipment manufacturers, and manufacturers of tools for equipment manufacturing.  Representatives from utilities also attend the conference as well as Government representatives, policymakers, and the press.

Members of the Solar Energy Industries Association and the Solar Electric Power Association receive discounts on registration.

The majority of attendees of Solar Power International come from the United States, however there are a large number of attendees from major solar markets such as China, Japan, and Germany.

Conference Sessions
The conference sessions at Solar Power International are traditionally separated by topic into different tracks. Typical tracks are technical, marketing & sales, market conditions, finance, and politics. There are generally over 70 sessions over the four-day conference.

Start-Up Alley

Start-Up Alley, located on the Expo floor, is a dedicated area specifically designed to promote up-and-coming ideas and companies in the solar industry. It was added to the conference features in 2013.

Past Conferences

External links
 https://web.archive.org/web/20081025030000/http://www.solarpowerconference.com/
 http://www.solarpowerinternational.com/

References

Solar power in the United States
Technology conferences
Trade shows in the United States